The Magic Voyage is a 1992 German animated fantasy film produced and directed by Michael Schoemann. It was released in Germany by Bavaria Film on 14 February 1992. The film was later dubbed in English and released in the United States and Canada: two English dubs were actually produced. The first one was a rare English dub released by Atlas Film, while the second English dub was produced by Hemdale Film Corporation, released as The Magic Voyage on 23 April 1993 with a new and more well-known voice cast. The latter dub had a different music soundtrack, and both English dubs had different translations.

Plot
In 1492, many believe that the Earth is flat and that ships could fall over the planet's edge; the dangers of the ocean have thus far prevented the extensive travel that would disprove this belief. However, Italian navigator Christopher Columbus theorizes that the Earth is a cube, which negatively affects his cartography. An adventuring woodworm named Pico eats away the corners of Columbus' cube globe, which convinces him that the Earth is round. With the prospect of falling off the Earth eliminated, Columbus concludes that he could reach the Indies faster by sea travel than Marco Polo had done by land, and he goes to present his theory to King Ferdinand and Queen Isabella of Spain in the hope of receiving funding for an expedition. Columbus' proposal outrages King Ferdinand, but Queen Isabella is won over by her own attraction to Columbus as well as his promise of spices, gold and jewelry, and she grants his request for three ships. King Ferdinand, not expecting Columbus to return, agrees to the voyage, but tells Columbus that if he does not return with gold, he will be executed. Meanwhile, Pico snoops around the castle and meets Marilyn, the princess of the moon sprites. Marilyn's land was invaded by the Swarm Lord, and she had been kept prisoner in the castle's chandelier until she reveals the secret of her powers to him. Pico and Marilyn attempt to escape, but the Swarm Lord returns and takes Marilyn to his kingdom in the still-undiscovered New World.

The next day, Columbus is about to set sail on the Santa Maria to discover the New World. Pico rushes to the ship, but is stopped by a trio of rats, who plan to eat him. Pico informs the rats of a food supply on Columbus' ship, but they leave Pico behind, and he narrowly reaches the ship by hitching a ride on a passing seagull. The rats, having learned that the ship is sailing to the supposed end of the world, attempt to steal Columbus' lifeboat and flee, but Pico dissuades them from the theft by convincing them that the New World is a land of cheese. Pico reunites with Columbus and explains that he needs to save Marilyn. Columbus' crewmates overhear their captain talking to Pico and come to the conclusion that Columbus is crazy. That night, Pico overhears the crew plotting to kill Columbus to avoid sailing off the Earth's edge. Columbus, upon Pico's warning, placates the crew with a song about heroic sailors. The next day, the crew's morale drops once more when a supposed island turns out to be a deserted Viking ship. As the crew try to hang Columbus, he sees the New World from the mast. The Swarm Lord appears and attempts to destroy the ship, but it manages to make it ashore.

Pico, Columbus, a beaver and two surviving rats venture through the island's jungle and reach the Swarm Lord's Aztec temple. As the Swarm Lord attempts to steal Marilyn's powers, Pico rescues her while Columbus climbs to the top of the Swarm Lord's giant honeycomb and takes a golden idol. Columbus uses the idol to squash the Swarm Lord, and the beaver destroys the temple by chewing through the honeycomb. The team escapes, but Marilyn drowns in a waterfall and is found lifeless on a floating flower. Once the sun rises, she comes back to life and Pico and Marilyn kiss. The natives of the island thank Columbus for destroying the Swarm Lord. The group sail off back to Spain, and Columbus is happy knowing that he discovered the New World and proved that the world is round.

Cast

Daran Norris, Henry Crowell Jr., James Knapp, Brett Baxter Clark, Ted Prior and Rosemary Alexander provide additional voices in the Hemdale dub.

Marshall Raynor, Marcus Calvin, David Creedon, Nick Lloyd, Helena Jungwirth, Dilys Goggins, Elmore James, J. Drew Lucas, David Kehoe, Phil Nibbelink, Deborah Norris, Jack Luceno, Marian Schikorn, Ron Williams, Osman Ragheb, Ziad Ragheb, Elisabeth Von Molo, and David Williamson provide additional voices in the Atlas dub, though many of their roles are unidentified since they weren't given specific credits.

Songs
The songs are written by Scott Santoro, except "Heaven Is" written by Harald Kloser, Tommy Schobel, Al Jarreau, and Robby Scharf.
 Christopher Columbus – Instrumental
 Pico the Adventurer – Pico (Corey Feldman)
 A Fellow Like You – Pico and Christopher Columbus (Corey Feldman and Dom DeLuise)
 The World of Magic – Marilyn (Irene Cara)
 The Life of the Sea – Christopher Columbus (Dom DeLuise)
 We'll Always Be Together – Pico and Marilyn (Corey Feldman and Irene Cara)
 Heaven Is – Al Jarreau

Production
The film was originally released in Germany in 1992, the year when America celebrated the 500th anniversary of the famous voyage of Christopher Columbus. Other films released during this time of year include 1492: Conquest of Paradise, Carry On Columbus and Christopher Columbus: The Discovery.

At the time, the film was the most-expensive animated production in Germany, costing $14.5 million. During the film's release in German theaters, director Schoemann stated that the film was intended to be a film about the discovery of America "from a more satirical view in order to differentiate ourselves clearly from the lofty views of history so we can present Columbus as a lovable, charming and befuddled scholar".

During initial stages of the film's production, the film would star the woodworm from Stowaways on the Ark (another German animated film produced by MS-Film), as well as a modest Columbus. However, the film was altered once American partners started investing on it, and it saw potential for an international market. Phil Nibbelink was the animation director, while American animators Stanley Green, Kevin Richardson, Rick Morrison and George Singer assisted the animation department. Production lasted for three years.

There are two English dubbed versions of the film produced; the first dubbed version including the voices of Donald Arthur as Christopher Columbus, as well as Phil Nibbelink and several German voice actors playing miscellaneous roles. The availability of this version is rare, but it can be obtained through Malaysian VCD releases distributed by Berjaya HVN Sdn Bhd and Croatian VHS ones with subtitles. The second English dub was recorded for the North American home-video release with a more well-known cast, including Dom DeLuise as Christopher Columbus, Corey Feldman as Pico, Irene Cara as Marilyn and Mickey Rooney as the Narrator. Particularly notable in this dub is an abundance of ad-libbing. The U.S. dub was written by David T. Reilly and Visual Effects supervisor Scott Santoro.

Home media
The film was released under its original German version by Warner Bros. in home media, in France and Germany. Specifically, Warner Home Video released the film in Germany on VHS and LaserDisc, and Warner Vision on DVD in France, in co-operation with the Jean-Paul Bretagnolle Group (which would previously release it on VHS), in November 1999.

In North America, the second English dubbed version came out on Hemdale Home Video on 3 December 1993. Image Entertainment and Faber International Films has carried over the Hemdale English dub onto the DVD release, which came out on 28 September 1999. In the Netherlands, this version was dubbed in Dutch and released on VCD and VHS in 1995 by CNR Film & Video, and on DVD by First Look. Its title is Pico en het geheim van de gouden tempel (English: Pico and the Secret of the Golden Temple). An Italian dub of it released by Alfadedis Entertainment, starring Tullio Solenghi as Columbus and Mino Caprio as Pico, was released on VHS.

Merchandise
A book titled Pico & Columbus, written by Anna Benthin, was released in Germany in 1991 by Loewe Bindlach, prior the film's release. It was re-released in 1993 by Habel.

References

External links

 
 
 
 The Magic Voyage at New York Times
 Die Abenteuer von Pico und Columbus at moviemeter.nl (Dutch)
 Die Abenteuer von Pico und Columbus at filmportal.de (German)
 Die Abenteuer von Pico und Columbus at csfd.cz (Slovakia)

1992 films
1993 films
1992 animated films
1993 animated films
German animated fantasy films
German children's films
1990s German-language films
German independent films
1990s children's fantasy films
Cultural depictions of Christopher Columbus
Films set in the 1490s
Fiction set in 1492
Age of Discovery films
Films set in Spain
Films set in Central America
Animated films set in New York City
1990s children's films
Films scored by Harald Kloser
1990s children's animated films
1990s German films